The Boroondara Eisteddfod is a music competition held annually in the City of Boroondara, Melbourne, Australia.

History 
The first Eisteddfod was held in 1992 as the Camberwell Eisteddfod, under the auspices of the then-City of Camberwell. It was established by Council  in December 1991 to provide a musical competition for the area, following the closure of the Hartwell Eisteddfod. Venues included the City of Camberwell Ballroom and Balwyn Community Centre. 

In the events surrounding the sacking of the Camberwell Council in 1993, the Victorian Government's investigation into the council examined the circumstances under which the event was established. It found that the expenditure on the 1992 Eisteddfod "likely...was illegal" due to its failure to be properly authorised. Nevertheless, the Eisteddfod continued.

Following council amalgamations in 1994, Camberwell became part of the new City of Boroondara and the Eisteddfod was renamed to account for this change.

Hawthorn Town Hall redevelopment 
During the redevelopment of the Hawthorn Town Hall into a regional arts centre, the Eisteddfod's main venues became unavailable. This necessitated moving events to other venues across Boroondara, including the Methodist Ladies' College, Camberwell Town Hall and Kew Court House. The Eisteddfod moved back to the newly-refurbished Hawthorn Arts Centre in 2015.

Sections 
In 2016, the Eisteddfod ran 39 separate sections, catering for solo and group performers.

Awards 
Certificates for first, second and third places, as well as honourable mentions, are awarded in each section.

Supporter awards 
A number of other awards, mostly donated from individual benefactors or community groups, are also open to competitors in particular sections.

Notable competitors 
 Elena Xanthoudakis (soprano singer)

References

External links 
 Boroondara Eisteddfod website

Eisteddfod
Music competitions in Australia